Josh Wardle is a Welsh software engineer who developed the viral web-based word game Wordle.  The New York Times Company acquired Wordle from Wardle in late January 2022. Wardle lives in Brooklyn, New York.

Early life and education 
Wardle is from South Wales, and he was brought up on an organic livestock farm in Llanddewi Rhydderch, a small village near Abergavenny.

He attended university at Royal Holloway, University of London and earned a degree in Media Arts. A few years later, he moved to the United States to attend the University of Oregon, where he graduated with a Master of Fine Arts in Digital Art.

He has three brothers, one of whom is documentary film maker Tim Wardle, director of the 2018 film Three Identical Strangers.

Career

Reddit & Pinterest 
After completing graduate school, Wardle moved to Oakland, California and began working as an artist at Reddit in 2011. He later became one of Reddit's first product managers, serving as a product manager for the community engineering team. In this position, he created popular collaborative experimental games such as The Button in 2015 and Place in 2017.

He left Reddit for almost two years to work as a software engineer at Pinterest, before returning to Reddit also as a software engineer.

Wordle 

In 2013, while working at Reddit, Wardle made a prototype of word game Wordle, a play on his last name.

In January 2021, he returned to his 2013 prototype to create a word game for his partner, Palak Shah. During the COVID-19 pandemic, he and Shah had played many New York Times games including Spelling Bee, and he wanted to make a new word game that they could play together. Shah played a vital role in the game's development before it went public. She reviewed the English language's 12,000 five-letter words and narrowed them down to 2,500 commonly-known words that could be used in the daily puzzle.

From January to June 2021, Wardle and Shah played the game and didn't tell anyone else about it. Wardle shared the game with his family members next, before he made it widely available in October 2021 by posting it on his own website, powerlanguage.co.uk. Wordle had no advertisements and Wardle's goal was not to make money. Despite Wordle's success, Wardle did not want it to become his full-time job.

The game had 90 players by 1 November, within a month of Wardle making it public. One month later the game had 300,000 daily players, which rose to two million by the following week.

In January 2022, The New York Times Company announced that it had acquired Wordle "for an undisclosed price in the low-seven figures."

MSCHF 
Since December 2021, Wardle has been a software engineer at Brooklyn-based art collective MSCHF, which created Lil Nas X's Satan Shoes.

References 

Living people
Welsh engineers
Alumni of Royal Holloway, University of London
University of Oregon alumni
British software engineers
Year of birth missing (living people)
Reddit people